Groote Schuur Hospital is a large, government-funded, teaching hospital situated on the slopes of Devil's Peak in the city of Cape Town, South Africa. It was founded in 1938 and is famous for being the institution where the first human-to-human heart transplant took place, conducted by University of Cape Town-educated surgeon Christiaan Barnard on the patient Louis Washkansky.

Groote Schuur is the chief academic hospital of the University of Cape Town's medical school, providing tertiary care and instruction in all the major branches of medicine. The hospital underwent major extension in 1984 when two new wings were added. As such, the old main building now mainly houses several academic clinical departments as well as a museum about the first human heart transplant.

The hospital is known for its trauma unit, anaesthesiology and internal medicine departments. Groote Schuur attracts many visiting medical students, residents and specialists each year who come to gain experience in various fields. As December 2006, the hospital employed over 500 doctors, 1300 nurses and 250 allied health professionals.

Groote Schuur is Dutch for 'Great Barn' and is named after the original Groote Schuur estate laid out by Dutch settlers when the city of Cape Town was founded in the 17th century.

The hospital was declared a Western Cape Provincial Heritage Site in 1996.

The N2, merged with the M3, bends around the hospital and Table Mountain National Park on a massive uphill 10-lane highway. This intersection has been named Hospital Bend due to its proximity to the hospital.

See also
 Heart of Cape Town Museum

References

External links

 Official hospital website
 Heart of Cape Town Museum

Hospital buildings completed in 1938
Hospitals in Cape Town
Teaching hospitals in South Africa
University of Cape Town
Hospitals established in 1938
South African heritage sites
1938 establishments in South Africa
Observatory, Cape Town
20th-century architecture in South Africa